Isaac Melville McCune (August 27, 1884 – October 15, 1959) was a provincial politician from Alberta, Canada. He served as a member of the Legislative Assembly of Alberta from 1935 to 1940 sitting with the Social Credit caucus in government.

Political career
McCune ran for a seat to the Alberta Legislature as a Social Credit candidate in the electoral district of 	Gleichen in the 1935 Alberta general election. He defeated incumbent John Buckley and two other candidates by a wide margin to pick up the seat for his party.

McCune ran for a second term in the 1940 Alberta general election. He was handily defeated by independent candidate Donald McKinnon finishing in second place out of three candidates.

References

External links
Legislative Assembly of Alberta Members Listing

Alberta Social Credit Party MLAs
1884 births
1959 deaths
American emigrants to Canada